In linear algebra, a semi-orthogonal matrix is a non-square matrix with real entries where: if the number of columns exceeds the number of rows, then the rows are orthonormal vectors; but if the number of rows exceeds the number of columns, then the columns are orthonormal vectors.

Equivalently, a non-square matrix A is semi-orthogonal if either

In the following, consider the case where A is an m × n matrix for m > n.
Then

The fact that  implies the isometry property

 for all x in Rn.

For example,  is a semi-orthogonal matrix.

A semi-orthogonal matrix A is semi-unitary (either A†A = I or AA† = I) and either left-invertible or right-invertible (left-invertible if it has more rows than columns, otherwise right invertible). As a linear transformation applied from the left, a semi-orthogonal matrix with more rows than columns preserves the dot product of vectors, and therefore acts as an isometry of Euclidean space, such as a rotation or reflection.

References

Geometric algebra
Matrices